Lìyán' (利言; fl. 726-788) was a Buddhist monk (沙門) from Kucha. According to the Biographies of eminent monks compiled during the Song period (T 2061, 50:804b17 ff.), he was originally from Kucha. He was ordained in 726, and is said to have mastered a wide range of Buddhist texts and the Chinese classics. He acted an amanuensis to the Indian Buddhist monk Dharmacandra (Fǎyuè 法月;  653–743 CE) when he translated Pǔbiànzhìcáng bōrěbōluómìduō xīnjīng (普遍智藏般若波羅蜜多心經; T 252), a version of the  Prajñāpāramitā-hṛdaya-sūtra in 738 CE (T 2157; 55.748c05). 

Lìyán was also amanuensis to Kashmiri monk  Prajñā during his translation of Bōrěbōluómìduō xīnjīng (般若波羅蜜多心經; T 253) a version of the  Prajñāpāramitā-hṛdaya-sūtra in 788 CE. He was also involved in making Chinese translations of the Mahāyāna Six Paramitas Sūtra (Dàshèng lǐqù liùbōluómìduō jīng 大乘理趣六波羅蜜多經; T 261). However, note that Japanese Scholar, Tsukinowa Kenryū, believes that Prajñā composed rather than translated his works 

Lìyán own works include a Chinese-Sanskrit dictionary for ritual practice, Fànyǔ zámíng (梵語雜名; T 2135) 

Liyan's translation activities were carried out that the  Hànlín (翰林) Translation Academy at Guāngzhái Monastery (光宅寺) (T 2061, 50: 716b17-8).

See also

 Chinese Buddhism

References

Bibliography
 Sòng gāosēng zhuàn jìn gāosēng chuán biǎo 《宋高僧傳 進高僧傳表》 “Biographies of eminent monks compiled during the Song period” (T 2061).  
 Tsukinowa Kenryū 月輪 賢隆. 1956. “Hannya sanzō no hon’yaku ni taisuru higi 般若三蔵の翻經に対する批議.” Indo-gaku Bukkyō-gaku Kenkyū 4(2): 434-443.    
 Yuánzhào 圓照. 794. 《大唐貞元續開元釋教錄》 Dà táng zhēnyuán xù kāiyuán shìjiào lù. Newly Authorized Catalog of Shakyamuni’s Teachings of the Zhenyuan Era. [aka Zhēnyuán Catalogue].(T 2156).   
 Yuánzhào 圓照. 800 《貞元新定釋教目錄 》 Zhēnyuán xīndìng shìjiào mù lù Zhenyuan. Revised List of Canonical Buddhist Texts of the Zhenyuan Era. (T 2157)

8th-century Buddhists
Tang dynasty translators
Sanskrit–Chinese translators
Tang dynasty Buddhist monks
8th-century Chinese translators